Temes-Aga may refer to:
Brestovăț, Romania
Banatski Brestovac, Serbia